The 2010 AON Open Challenger was a professional tennis tournament played on outdoor red clay courts. It was the 8th edition of the tournament which was part of the 2010 ATP Challenger Tour. It took place in Genoa, Italy between 7 and 12 September.

ATP entrants

Seeds

 Rankings are as of August 30, 2010.

Other entrants
The following players received wildcards into the singles main draw:
  Daniele Bracciali
  Marco Cecchinato
  Alessandro Giannessi
  Walter Trusendi

The following players received entries as an Alternate into the singles main draw:
  Johannes Ager
  Gianluca Naso
  Dawid Olejniczak

The following players received entry from the qualifying draw:
  Guillermo Durán
  Patricio Heras
  Francesco Piccari
  Cristian Rodríguez

Champions

Singles

 Fabio Fognini def.  Potito Starace, 6–4, 6–1

Doubles

 Andre Begemann /  Martin Emmrich def.  Brian Battistone /  Andreas Siljeström, 1–6, 7–6(3), [10–7]

References
Official website
ITF Search 

AON Open Challenger
AON Open Challenger
Clay court tennis tournaments
AON Open Challenger
September 2010 sports events in Italy
21st century in Genoa